Electrification may refer to:

Technology 
Electrification, the process of converting a system to use electricity as its energy source
Electrification of transport
Rail electrification
Rural electrification, the process of bringing electrical power to rural and remote areas

Physics
 (An object is) charged with (static) electricity, see Electric charge

Music
 Electrified (Dressy Bessy album), 2005
 Electrified (Pink Cream 69 album), 1998
 Electrify (song), a song by British DJ and producer Jakwob from his upcoming debut studio album
 "Electrified", a song by Gotthard from the album Silver